MRS-1 may refer to:
ALCO MRS-1, a Military Road Switcher locomotive built by ALCO
EMD MRS-1, a Military Road Switcher locomotive built by EMD

pt:MRS-1